The Liberales Institut (Liberal Institute, Institut Libéral, Istituto Liberale) is a Swiss classical liberal think tank, founded in Zürich in 1979. It publishes mainly in German, French and Italian, and accessorily in English.

Since 1 January 2008 it has been led by the economist and author Pierre Bessard, the current chairman of its board of trustees is the attorney-at-law Daniel Eisele.

Personnel 
 Pierre Bessard, President 
 Christian Hoffmann, head of research 
 Daniel Eisele, Chairman 
 Christoph Frei, Vice-Chairman
 Victoria Curzon Price, Trustee
 Robert Nef, Trustee
 Daniel Model, Trustee
 Sandro Piffaretti, Trustee
 Peter Ruch, Trustee

External links 
 

1979 establishments in Switzerland
Think tanks established in 1979
Think tanks based in Switzerland
Classical liberalism
Political and economic think tanks based in Europe
Libertarian think tanks
Libertarianism in Switzerland